Frederick T. Farrier (born May 9, 1972) is an American football coach and former player.  He is running backs coach and recruiting coordinator at Alabama A&M University.  Farrier served as the head football coach at Morgan State University from 2016 to 2017, compiling a record of 4–18. He served as the head football coach at Kentucky State University from 2005 to 2008, compiling a record of 19–25. He was let go as of July 24, 2009. Farrier played college football as a wide receiver at the College of the Holy Cross. He became the interim head coach at Morgan State on February 11, 2016 after their previous head coach Lee Hull accepted a position with the Indianapolis Colts in the National Football League (NFL). On December 9, 2016, Farrier was promoted from interim to full-time head coach.

Head coaching record

References

External links
 Alabama A&M profile

1972 births
Living people
American football wide receivers
Alabama A&M Bulldogs football coaches
Holy Cross Crusaders football coaches
Kentucky State Thorobreds football coaches
Michigan State Spartans football coaches
Morgan State Bears football coaches
RPI Engineers football coaches
Shaw Bears football coaches
South Carolina State Bulldogs football coaches
Tennessee Tech Golden Eagles football coaches
People from Cleveland Heights, Ohio
Sportspeople from Cuyahoga County, Ohio
Coaches of American football from Ohio
Players of American football from Ohio
African-American coaches of American football
African-American players of American football
20th-century African-American sportspeople
21st-century African-American sportspeople